Navarre (named after the Navarre region in Spain) is a village in Stark County, Ohio, United States. The population was 1,957 at the 2010 census. It is part of the Canton-Massillon, OH Metropolitan Statistical Area.

Navarre was the home of Orlando Poe, a United States Army officer in the American Civil War and an engineer who was responsible for much of the early lighthouse construction on the Great Lakes. It was also the childhood home of Red House Painters/Sun Kil Moon singer-songwriter Mark Kozelek.

Geography
Navarre is located at  (40.723708, -81.521449), along the Tuscarawas River.

Demographics

2010 census
As of the census of 2010, there were 1,957 people, 868 households, and 501 families living in the village. The racial makeup of the village was 98.2% White, 0.7% African American, 0.1% Native American, 0.2% Asian, 0.1% Pacific Islander, 0.1% from other races, and 0.8% from two or more races. Hispanic or Latino of any race were 0.7% of the population.

There were 868 households, of which 22.8% had children under the age of 18 living with them, 42.2% were married couples living together, 10.0% had a female householder with no husband present, 5.5% had a male householder with no wife present, and 42.3% were non-families. 37.7% of all households were made up of individuals, and 18.5% had someone living alone who was 65 years of age or older. The average household size was 2.10 and the average family size was 2.74.

The median age in the village was 48.9 years. 17.7% of residents were under the age of 18; 6% were between the ages of 18 and 24; 20.8% were from 25 to 44; 29% were from 45 to 64; and 26.2% were 65 years of age or older. The gender makeup of the village was 47.2% male and 52.8% female.

2000 census

As of the census of 2000, there were 1,441 people, 606 households, and 369 families living in the village. The population density was 957.8 people per square mile (370.7/km2). There were 649 housing units at an average density of 431.7 per square mile (167.1/km2). The racial makeup of the village was 98.89% White, 0.35% African American, 0.07% Pacific Islander, and 0.69% from two or more races. Hispanic or Latino of any race were 0.07% of the population.

There were 606 households, out of which 24.3% had children under the age of 18 living with them, 48.5% were married couples living together, 8.6% had a female householder with no husband present, and 39.1% were non-families. 35.8% of all households were made up of individuals, and 19.1% had someone living alone who was 65 years of age or older. The average household size was 2.20 and the average family size was 2.83.

In the village, the population was spread out, with 19.4% under the age of 18, 7.3% from 18 to 24, 22.8% from 25 to 44, 24.4% from 45 to 64, and 26.0% who were 65 years of age or older. The median age was 45 years. For every 100 females there were 82.3 males. For every 100 females age 18 and over, there were 78.2 males.

The median income for a household in the village was $33,382, and the median income for a family was $41,515. Males had a median income of $30,772 versus $22,778 for females. The per capita income for the village was $18,246. About 4.5% of families and 5.7% of the population were below the poverty line, including 8.1% of those under age 18 and 3.2% of those age 65 or over.

Notable person
Orlando Metcalfe Poe, Union Army officer

References

External links
 Village website

Villages in Stark County, Ohio
Villages in Ohio